Stanislav Viktorovich Goncharov (born 9 June 1983) is a former Russian professional football player.

Club career
He played two seasons in the Russian Football National League for FC Yenisey Krasnoyarsk.

Honours
 Russian Second Division Zone East best player: 2005.
 Russian Second Division Zone East top scorer: 2005 (19 goals).

External links

1983 births
Living people
Russian footballers
Association football midfielders
FC Yenisey Krasnoyarsk players
FC Smena Komsomolsk-na-Amure players